Paracadute is a record company owned by OK Go. OK Go left their previous record company, EMI, because of a disagreement between the band and the label. OK Go reissued their album, Of the Blue Colour of the Sky, with Paracadute taking care of the promotion and distribution of the album reissues. OK Go's lead singer, Damian Kulash, announced the new label in a video posted to the band's YouTube channel.

In addition to OK Go's music, Paracadute has released projects by Lavender Diamond, Pyyramids, and a smart phone app called "Say The Same Thing."

Infinity Shred, an electronic chiptune band, joined Paracadute with their new album release Sanctuary.

Artists who signed with Paracadute
 OK Go (Founder)
 Pyyramids
 Lavender Diamond
 Infinity Shred

Projects released with Paracadute
 OK Go – Hungry Ghosts
 OK Go – Of the Blue Colour of the Sky
 OK Go – Of the Blue Colour of the Sky (Extra Nice Edition)
 OK Go – 180/365
 OK Go – Twelve Remixes of OK Go
 OK Go – Twelve Days of OK Go
 OK Go – Twelve Months of OK Go
 Lavender Diamond – Incorruptible Heart
 Pyyramids – Human Beings
 Pyyramids – Brightest Darkest Day
 Say the Same Thing (app)
 Infinity Shred – Sanctuary

References

External links
 Label Announcement (YouTube)

American record labels
Record labels established in 2010
2010 establishments in the United States
Alternative rock record labels
OK Go